Regensberg is a municipality in the district of Dielsdorf in the canton of Zurich in Switzerland.

This is not to be confused with similarly named Regensburg, a German city in Bavaria.

Regensberg may also refer to:

Regensberg Castle, sometimes referred to Neu-Regensberg, a hill castle in Switzerland built about the mid-13th century 
Alt-Regensberg Castle, also referred to Altburg, a hill castle which was built about the mid-11th century AD
Regensberg family, a family of counts from the Canton of Zürich in Switzerland

See also
Regensburg (disambiguation)